These hits topped the Ultratop 50 in 2018.

See also
List of number-one albums of 2018 (Belgium)
2018 in music

References

Ultratop 50
Belgium Ultratop 50
2018